Pavel Ivanov (born 26 February 1988) is a Bulgarian professional basketball player who plays for Balkan of the Bulgarian League.

References

External links
 Profile at abaliga.com
 Profile at basketball.realgm.com
 Profile at eurobasket.com
 Profile at levskibasket.com

Living people
1988 births
BC Levski Sofia players
BC Balkan Botevgrad players
Bulgarian men's basketball players
Shooting guards
Small forwards